Gdańsk Lech Wałęsa Airport (formerly)  is an international airport located  northwest of Gdańsk, Poland, not far from the city centres of the Tricity metropolitan area: Gdańsk, Sopot and Gdynia. Since 2004 the airport has been named after Lech Wałęsa, the former Polish president. With around 5.4 million passengers served in 2019, it is the 3rd largest airport in Poland in terms of passenger traffic.

History

Early years (1910s–1950s)
The first passenger flights in Gdańsk were operated in the year 1919 from an airfield in the Langfuhr district of the Free City of Danzig (now the Wrzeszcz district of Gdańsk). It was possible thanks to a transformation of that military location into a civilian facility. The airport was at that time additionally used for airmail services and by the police.  In the next years, the airport continued acquisitions of further areas which allowed it to expand and invest in modern infrastructure. The technical development of Gdansk Wrzeszcz Airport (Danzig-Langfuhr Airport) was followed by the launching of regular routes to Warsaw, Berlin, Moscow, Königsberg and other important cities of the region. The flights were operated by numerous international aviation companies.

The first Polish route was served between Gdańsk, Warsaw and Lviv by Aerolloyd beginning in September 1922. The company initially used Junkers F.13 aircraft on that route. This domestic service was the beginning of the company which later became LOT Polish Airlines, which is still Poland's national carrier.

A railway connection to Gdansk Wrzeszcz Airport was built in the 1920s. This was followed by new tram tracks in 1930. The airport itself had a concrete runway which had light and navigation facilities allowing aircraft to land and to take off at night. In the 1930s, Gdansk Wrzeszcz Airport served fewer than 2 thousand passengers annually , but it was an important international hub that connected four countries and provided transport facilities between Polish cities.

The airport in Wrzeszcz was an important base of the German air forces during World War II. Even before that, German pilots had been trained on the grounds of this airport. Heavy bombings and other military activities led to the destruction of the airport.  However, it was reconstructed after the war and it was provided with modern technologies which allowed the airport to develop. Old domestic routes as well as many international destinations were relaunched. The airport had regular connections to countries like Hungary, Germany, Bulgaria, Denmark and Sweden.

New location since 1970s
As the airport facilities became old and nonfunctional at the end of the 1960s (including runway lights which forced airport authorities to ban night flights), a new location near the village of Rębiechowo was chosen. The airport had to be built somewhere else also because of further urban development. New areas were needed in order to make it possible for the public investors to construct new buildings for the growing population of Gdańsk. Furthermore, a new longer runway was necessary in order to allow larger jet airliners to take off and land safely as the era of modern jet aircraft began. The old airport in Wrzeszcz was officially closed on 1 May 1974, and a large housing estate was built on its grounds. Nowadays, only a few remaining elements of the old Wrzeszcz airport infrastructure can be found, including remnants of its main north–south oriented runway in what is now the Zaspa district.

After the closure of the old airport, the new one was built, and it opened in 1974 near the village of Rębiechowo (on westernmost land incorporated into the Gdańsk borough of Matarnia in 1973). The airport acquired its current name in 2004. There was some controversy as to whether the name should be spelled Lech Walesa (without diacritics, but better recognizable in the world) or Lech Wałęsa (with Polish letters, but difficult to write and pronounce for foreigners, the closest English phonetic approximation being "Vawensa").

Since 1993, Gdańsk Airport has been owned 31.45% by the authorities of Pomeranian Voivodeship, 29.45% by the city of Gdańsk, 1.14% by the city of Gdynia, 0.35% by the city of Sopot and 37.61% by Polish Airports State Enterprise. In 2006, the airport served for the first time in its history more than 1 million passengers per year. In 2010, the passenger number was higher than 2 million. After the construction of a new modern passenger terminal with extended capacities (the opening took place in April 2012 ahead of the UEFA Euro 2012 football championships), the airport continued its development and it served for the first time over 3 million passengers in a single year in 2014. In summer season 2015, airlines flying to and from the airport served over 50 regular routes as well as charter and cargo flights.

Airport infrastructure

Airside facilities
Gdańsk Lech Wałęsa Airport has a single asphalt-concrete runway in the direction of 11/29. In addition, the navigation facilities at the airport are supplemented with a modern wide area multilateration system.

The runway as well as taxiways are equipped with light aids system using LED technology. The lighting of the runway can be remotely controlled from the flight control tower. The runway has eight exit taxiways leading to five parking aprons where up to 18 middle-sized aircraft (e.g. Boeing 737 or Airbus 321) can be parked. The airport also has an extra apron used in winter for de-icing of aircraft. The deicing pad has been constructed in a way which allows keeping up ecological standards.

Passenger terminals

Gdańsk Lech Wałęsa Airport has two passengers terminals (T1 and T2), of which only Terminal T2 is fully functional. Terminal T1 was built in 1993 and is currently being used for departures (passport control and boarding) to countries which are not part of Schengen Area, mainly to Great Britain, Ireland and holiday destinations e.g. to Egypt. There are no check-in desks in Terminal T1 but passengers waiting for their flights can do the shopping at duty-free stores located close to the departure gates. The building is connected with the newer Terminal T2 with a bridge. The old building is planned to be torn down in the future when the new terminal is extended.

The new terminal, called Terminal T2, is a modern building with characteristic architectural elements, the roof imitating waves at sea being an example of them. It was constructed west of Terminal T1. The first part (departures only) was completed in 2012, and the arrival area started operations in September 2015. Since then, Terminal 1 has not been serving any arriving flights.

The overall area of Terminal 2 amounts to approx. . The terminal has a direct link to a railway station. It has 25 check-in desks, a highly modern luggage transport and sorting facility and a spacious departure area with gates. At the airport in Gdańsk, five jet bridges are available for airlines to use. The terminal handled 3.3 million passengers in 2014 which was about 66% of its maximum capacity. However, after the completion of the new arrival area, the maximum capacity of the airport is estimated at 7 million passengers per year. The terminal offers services such as tourist information, shops, kiosks, bars, currency exchange desks, different car rentals and an executive lounge. There is also a conference room and facilities for handling VIP passengers and general aviation flights.

Future development
According to the airport authorities, Gdańsk Lech Wałęsa Airport will be further developed in the next years. Plans include an installation of an even more modern landing system ILS CAT IIIb which will allow pilots to operate at very poor visibility caused by fog and bad weather. Gdańsk Lech Wałęsa Airport will be the second airport in Poland, after Warsaw Chopin Airport, to have this facility.

The existing terminal is also planned to be extended despite the fact that it is new and can easily handle the current passengers flows. A new concourse will be constructed exclusively for departing flights. When it is finished, the old terminal building serving Non-Schengen flights will be either demolished or rebuilt for other purposes which will not be directly aimed at passenger services. The construction of the new part of the terminal is planned to be finished in 2021.

After the modernization and extension work, the new capacity of the Gdańsk Lech Wałęsa Airport will be at the estimated level of 9 million passengers annually.

Also, a completely new district of Gdansk is planned to be built directly next to the airport. It will be called Gdansk Airport City and it will consist mainly of new buildings with offices and services as well as hotels. The construction works are planned to begin in 2019. However, some facilities that will become a part of the Airport City in the future already exist. These include the Allcon Park offering office areas, as well as the first of the planned five buildings of BCB Business Park. The existing Hampton by Hilton hotel located opposite the airport terminal will also be part of the new Airport City district in Gdansk.

Airlines and destinations

Passenger

Cargo

Statistics

Traffic

Airlines

Ground transportation

Rail

Pomorska Kolej Metropolitalna (PKM, the 'Pomeranian Metropolitan Railway) connects Gdańsk Lech Wałęsa Airport with Wrzeszcz, Gdynia Główna railway station and downtown Gdańsk. It connects to the Szybka Kolej Miejska (Tricity) the 'Fast Urban Railway' which provides further connections by frequent trains every 6 minutes to 30 minutes to 27 stations throughout the Tricity.

As of October 2015, the tickets for the train to and from Gdańsk Lech Wałęsa Airport can be purchased in ZTM as well as SKM ticket machines located at stations throughout the city. Tickets are also sold in the trains by the conductors and they should be in this case purchased immediately after getting on the train. Regular tickets to and from Gdańsk (City ticket) cost 3,50 PLN one way. Regular tickets to/from Gdynia (Tricity ticket) cost 6,50 PLN one way. It is possible to change trains and to get to other areas of Tricity. In this case, the ticket prices may vary depending on the final station of the journey.

Bus
As of January 2018, the following city bus lines connect the airport:
to Gdańsk-Centre, (Orunia Gościnna), Route 210 via Gdańsk-Morena, Gdańsk Main Railway Station, old city.
to Gdańsk-Wrzeszcz, Route 110 to Gdańsk-Wrzeszcz railway station.
to Sopot, Route 122 to Sopot – Kamienny Potok railway station via Gdańsk-Wrzeszcz
night bus line N3 to Gdańsk-Wrzeszcz railway station and Gdańsk main railway station

See also
 List of airports in Poland
 Air ambulances in Poland

References

External links

 

Airports in Poland
Buildings and structures in Gdańsk
Transport in Gdańsk
Lech Wałęsa
Airports established in 1974
1974 establishments in Poland